Sir Cyril Reginald Sutton Kirkpatrick (1872–1957) was a British civil engineer.

Cyril Kirkpatrick was born in London in 1872.  Kirkpatrick was Chief Engineer for the Port of London and formed the engineering firm of Kirkpatrick and Partners in 1924.  He served as president of the Institution of Civil Engineers between November 1931 and November 1932.  Between 1938 and 1942 Kirkpatrick drew many plans to Maryport sea wall and harbour.  Kirpatrick's firm was also involved with the construction of concrete caissons for the Mulberry Harbours used following the Normandy Landings during the Second World War.  He served as president of the Smeatonian Society of Civil Engineers in 1950.  Kirkpatrick's firm merged with Scott and Wilson to form Scott & Wilson, Kirkpatrick and Partners in 1951.  This firm later became the Scott Wilson Group.

References 

        
        
        
        
        
        

British civil engineers
Presidents of the Institution of Civil Engineers
Presidents of the Smeatonian Society of Civil Engineers
Engineers from London
1872 births
1957 deaths
20th-century British engineers